The Algiers Central Post Office, is an office building for postal services located on Boulevard Mohamed-Khemisti, Alger Centre municipality in Algiers, Algeria. It was designed by architect Jules Voinot and Marius Toudoire and was constructed in 1910. It is Algeria's largest post office building, In 2015, the state turned it into a museum.

Image Gallery

See also
Algérie Poste

References

Monuments and memorials in Algeria
Government buildings completed in 1910
Office buildings completed in 1910
Grande Poste d'Alger
Post office buildings
20th-century architecture in Algeria